ICF may refer to:

Business
 ICF International, an American consulting firm
 Integral Coach Factory, an Indian manufacturer of rail coaches in Chennai
 ICF coach
 International Cablemakers Federation
 International Cremation Federation
 FIDE, whose English name is ICF (International Chess Federation)

Government organizations
 ICF Colony, a neighbourhood of Chennai associated with the Integral Coach Factory
 Intermediate Care Facility, provider of residential care
Institut Català de Finances, a public financial institution owned by the Government of Catalonia

Non-profit organizations
 International Curling Federation, a former name for the World Curling Federation
 Inter City Firm, a "hooligan firm" associated with West Ham United F.C.
 Inter-School Christian Fellowship
 International Canoe Federation, the world governing body for canoe and kayak sports
 International Carrom Federation, the governing body for the sport of carrom
 International Christian Fellowship, Sapporo, a church in Sapporo
 International Christian Fellowship, a church based in Zurich, Switzerland
 International Coaching Federation, dedicated to professional coaching
 Irish Cycling Federation 
 Island Corridor Foundation, a Canadian non-profit railway company

Science and technology
 Immunodeficiency, centromere instability and facial anomalies syndrome
 Inertial confinement fusion, a means of achieving nuclear fusion
 Informed consent form, a document for obtaining informed consent of a patient
 Insulating concrete form, a construction technique
 Integrated Coupling Facility, a Coupling Facility on IBM mainframe computers
 International Classification of Functioning, Disability and Health, a classification of health and functioning
 Internet Connection Firewall, the firewall in Windows XP
 Intracellular fluid, body fluid contained in cells (as opposed to extracellular fluid)